Joe Seddon (born 4 June 1997) is a British technology entrepreneur and social commentator. He is the founder of Zero Gravity, a technology company that supports low-income students into universities and careers.

Early life 
Seddon was born in Leeds, West Yorkshire in June 1997. He was raised in Morley, West Yorkshire in a single-parent family by his mother, Catherine, who works as a speech therapist in the National Health Service.

Seddon was educated at Westerton Primary, a local state school in Morley, West Yorkshire. He then studied at Heckmondwike Grammar School, a state school in Kirklees, West Yorkshire. In his later years at school, Seddon was involved in competitive debating, where he won a number of regional and national awards and was invited to join England's National Debating Team.

After leaving school, Seddon read Philosophy, Politics, and Economics (PPE) at Mansfield College, University of Oxford, graduating with first class honours. During university, he was an occasional contributor to The Daily Telegraph, where he wrote articles about reforming Britain's higher education system.

Career

Zero Gravity 
Upon graduating from the University of Oxford, Seddon founded Access Oxbridge, a mobile app that connected school students from low-income backgrounds with mentors currently studying at the Universities of Oxford and Cambridge. Prior to the app’s launch, British universities had come under criticism for the number of students admitted from private schools. In 2016, the University of Oxford gave 59% of offers to UK students from state schools, whilst 93% of all UK students are educated in state schools. Oxford University spends £14 million per year on  programs to recruit applicants from low-income backgrounds, costing £108,000 per student admitted.

Seddon’s app aimed to increase access to Oxford and Cambridge by matching low-income students with undergraduate mentors who coached students through weekly hour-long video calls. Seddon built the app from his hometown bedroom and initially funded the initiative from the remnants of his university maintenance grant. In its first year, 110 low-income students mentored on the app achieved offers to study at Oxford and Cambridge. In October 2019, Seddon was awarded the Prime Minister's Points of Light award for social impact in education.

Media coverage of Seddon’s work attracted the attention of a number of social impact investors who, in March 2020, provided Seddon with £425,000 of venture capital investment to expand his work. Seddon re-designed his app and relaunched it as Zero Gravity in May 2020. Zero Gravity aims to increase social mobility by developing technology to identify low-income students and provide them with personalised support to win places at UK universities, including Oxbridge and the Russell Group.

In 2020, over 1000 students mentored by Zero Gravity achieved offers to study at Russell Group universities. Zero Gravity has supported 261 low-income students to study at Oxford and Cambridge since its launch. In June 2021, Seddon received the Diana Award in memory of Princess Diana for social impact in the education sector.

In December 2021, Seddon confirmed that he had raised a seed round of investment in Zero Gravity totalling £3.5m. In 2022, he was named by Forbes in the Forbes 30 Under 30 list.

Advocacy and media
Seddon's work as an entrepreneur has been covered by BBC News, The Times, The Telegraph, and Corriere della Serra. He is a contributor to BBC News, BBC Radio 1 and BBC Radio 5 Live, where he discusses education, social mobility and careers. He has also been a guest speaker at the Cambridge Union, where he has delivered lectures on social entrepreneurship.

In October 2020, Seddon was appointed as a Trustee of the British Youth Council. Seddon is also a Governor of Lister Community School.

Personal life 
Seddon lives in London and is a Hull City supporter.

References 

1997 births
Living people
People educated at Heckmondwike Grammar School
Alumni of Mansfield College, Oxford
Alumni of the University of Oxford
English chief executives